Apolygus lucorum is a species of true bug in the Miridae family. It can be found everywhere in Europe except for Albania,  Bulgaria, Iceland, Malta, and Portugal.
and much of the Mediterranean basin, then east across the Palearctic to China and Japan.

Description

Biology
A. lucorum feeds on a range of plants including tansy, nettle, Eupatorium, foxglove, scrub thistle (Cirsium), willowherb (Epilobium) and particularly mugwort piercing the plant tissues and feeding on the sap. Adults are found from July to October.

References

Mirini
Insects described in 1843
Hemiptera of Europe